David Logan Whitelaw (9 August 1909 – 27 February 1979) was a Scottish footballer who played professionally for clubs including Southend United and Gillingham, for whom he made over 100 Football League appearances.

Whitelaw guested for clubs including Bournemouth & Boscombe Athletic, Chester and Wrexham during World War II.

References

1909 births
1979 deaths
Footballers from Glasgow
Scottish footballers
Bristol City F.C. players
Southend United F.C. players
Gillingham F.C. players
Wrexham A.F.C. players
English Football League players
AFC Bournemouth wartime guest players
Chester City F.C. wartime guest players
Wrexham F.C. wartime guest players
Association football goalkeepers